Palm Sunday is a 1981 collection of short stories, speeches, essays, letters, and other previously unpublished works by author Kurt Vonnegut Jr.

Contents
In addition to original material, Palm Sunday contains the following works (written by Vonnegut unless otherwise stated):
"Dear Mr. McCarthy" (letter)
"Un-American Nonsense" (essay)
"God's Law" (speech)
"Dear Felix" (letter)
"An Account of the Ancestry of Kurt Vonnegut, Jr, by an Ancient Friend of His Family" (formal essay by John G. Raunch)
"What I Liked About Cornell" (speech)
"When I Lost My Innocence" (essay)
"I Am Embarrassed" (speech)
"How to Write with Style" (essay)
Self-interview from The Paris Review
"Who in America is Truly Happy?" (essay)
"Something Happened" (review of Joseph Heller's novel)
"The Rocky Graziano of American Letters" (speech)
"The Best of Bob and Ray" (Vonnegut's introduction to a book by Bob Elliott and Ray Goulding)
"James T. Farrell" (funeral speech)
"Lavina Lyon" (funeral speech)
"The Class of '57" (song lyric by Don and Harold Reid of the Statler Brothers)
"The Noodle Factory" (speech)
"Mark Twain" (speech)
"How Jokes Work" (commencement address)
"Do Not Mourn!" (funeral speech by Clemens Vonnegut, written for his own funeral)
"Thoughts of a Free Thinker" (commencement address)
"William Ellery Channing" (speech)
"The Big Space Fuck" (short story)
"Fear and Loathing in Morristown, N J" (speech)
"Dear Mr X" (letter by Nanette Vonnegut)
"Jonathan Swift" (Vonnegut's rejected introduction to a new edition of Swift's Gulliver's Travels)
"The Chemistry Professor" (treatment for a musical comedy based on Dr Jekyll and Mr Hyde)
"Louis-Ferdinand Céline" (Vonnegut's introduction to paperback editions of Céline's last three novels)
"Dresden Revisited" (Vonnegut's introduction to a new edition of Slaughterhouse-Five)
"Flowers on the Wall" (song lyric by Lew DeWitt of the Statler Brothers)
"Palm Sunday" (sermon)

Grades
In Chapter 18, "The Sexual Revolution," Vonnegut grades his own works. He states that the grades "do not place me in literary history" and that he is comparing "myself with myself." The grades are as follows:
Player Piano: B
The Sirens of Titan: A
Mother Night: A
Cat's Cradle: A+
God Bless You, Mr. Rosewater: A
Slaughterhouse-Five: A+
Welcome to the Monkey House: B−
Happy Birthday, Wanda June: D
Breakfast of Champions: C
Wampeters, Foma and Granfalloons: C
Slapstick: D
Jailbird: A
Palm Sunday: C

1981 short story collections
Short story collections by Kurt Vonnegut
Essay collections